Elections to Liverpool City Council were held on Monday 2 November 1885. One third of the council seats were up for election, the term of office of each councillor being three years.

After the elections, the composition of the council was:

Election result

Ward results

* - Retiring Councillor seeking re-election

Abercromby

Castle Street

Everton

Exchange

Great George

Lime Street

North Toxteth

Pitt Street

Rodney Street

St. Anne Street

St. Paul's

St. Peter's

Scotland

South Toxteth

Vauxhall

West Derby

By-elections

No.2, Scotland, 11 November 1885

Caused by the resignation of Councillor Joseph Simpson (Liberal, Scotland, elected 
1 November 1883), reported to the Council on 2 December 1885.

No.12, Lime Street, 4 June 1886

Caused by the death of Councillor Thomas Patrick Holden (Party?, Lime Street, 
elected 1 November 1883) on 17 May 1886.

No. 16, North Toxteth, 22 July 1886

Alderman Thomas Rigby died on 4 June 1886.
In his place Councillor John Hughes (Conservative, North Toxteth, elected 1st 
November 1883)
was elected as an alderman by the Council (Councillors and Aldermen) on 7 July 
1886

See also

 Liverpool City Council
 Liverpool Town Council elections 1835 - 1879
 Liverpool City Council elections 1880–present
 Mayors and Lord Mayors of Liverpool 1207 to present
 History of local government in England

References

1885
1885 English local elections
1880s in Liverpool